David Harvey Goodell (May 6, 1834 – January 22, 1915) was an American inventor, manufacturer, and Republican politician from Antrim, New Hampshire.

Goodell was the son of Jesse Raymond Goodell (1807–1886) and Olive Atwood (Wright) Goodell (1807–1877).

Family life
Goodell married Hannah Jane Plummer (1835–1911) of Goffstown, New Hampshire on September 1, 1857.  They had two sons Dura Dana Goodell (1858–1936) and Richard Carter Goodell (1868–1942).

Business career
In 1875 Goodell began and operated the Goodell company in Antrim.
His company made knives and a collection of various cutting devices including apple peelers. His company was the largest employer with several mills spanning Great Brook.

Political career
From 1876 to 1878 Goodell represented Antrim in the New Hampshire House of Representatives, and was  member of the Governor's Council in 1882.  In November 1888 he was elected as the Governor.

Goodell died in 1915 in Antrim.

External links
Goodell at New Hampshire's Division of Historic Resources
David Harvey Goodell U.S., Find A Grave Index

Notes

1834 births
1915 deaths
Republican Party governors of New Hampshire
Members of the Executive Council of New Hampshire
Republican Party members of the New Hampshire House of Representatives
American manufacturing businesspeople
19th-century American politicians
19th-century American businesspeople